Dean Cornelius (born 11 April 2001) is a Scottish professional footballer who plays for Scottish Premiership club Motherwell, as a midfielder.

Club career
Cornelius signed for Motherwell in the summer of 2018 from Hibernian. He made his debut as a substitute in Motherwell's 3–2 victory at home to Livingston on 18 May 2019. 

In June 2021, he signed a new two-year contract with Motherwell. He made his first start for the club on 14 July 2021, in a 1–0 win away to Queen's Park in the Scottish League Cup group stage.
On 18 December 2021, Cornelius scored in his first Motherwell league start in a 2–0 home win against St Johnstone in the Scottish Premiership.

Career statistics

References

2001 births
Living people
Scottish footballers
Association football midfielders
Motherwell F.C. players
Scottish Professional Football League players
Footballers from Bellshill